Andy Uhrich is an American mixed martial artist who most recently competed in the Welterweight division of Bellator MMA. A professional competitor since 2007, he also competed for Strikeforce, Titan FC, and was a contestant on Fight Master: Bellator MMA.

Mixed martial arts record

|-
| Loss
| align=center| 11-6
| Paul Daley
| KO (punch)
| Bellator 148
| 
| align=center| 1
| align=center| 2:00
| Fresno, California, United States
|Welterweight bout.
|-
| Win
| align=center| 11-5
| Bobby Cooper
| Decision (split)
| TFC 33: Titan Fighting Championship 33
| 
| align=center| 3
| align=center| 5:00
| Mobile, Alabama, United States
| 
|-
| Win
| align=center| 10-5
| Marcus Andrusia
| Decision (unanimous)
| SFC: Summit Fighting Championships 10
| 
| align=center| 3
| align=center| 5:00
| Vicksburg, Mississippi, United States
|Middleweight debut.
|-
| Win
| align=center| 9-5
| Codale Ford
| Decision (unanimous)
| SFC: Summit Fighting Championships 7
| 
| align=center| 3
| align=center| 5:00
| Vicksburg, Mississippi, United States
|Lightweight debut.
|-
| Loss
| align=center| 8-5
| Ben Brewer
| KO (punches)
| Bellator 120
| 
| align=center| 2
| align=center| 2:40
| Southaven, Mississippi, United States
| 
|-
| Loss
| align=center| 8-4
| Nathan Coy
| Decision (unanimous)
| Bellator 101
| 
| align=center| 3
| align=center| 5:00
| Portland, Oregon, United States
| 
|-
| Win
| align=center| 8-3
| Joe Williams
| Decision (unanimous)
| Bellator 73
| 
| align=center| 3
| align=center| 5:00
| Tunica, Mississippi, United States
| 
|-
| Win
| align=center| 7-3
| Joshua Thorpe
| Submission (rear-naked choke)
| Prize Fight Promotions: Mid South MMA Championships 6
| 
| align=center| 3
| align=center| 4:27
| Southaven, Mississippi, United States
| 
|-
| Loss
| align=center| 6-3
| Charlie Rader
| KO (punches)
| Empire FC: A Night of Reckoning 4
| 
| align=center| 2
| align=center| 2:06
| Tunica, Mississippi, United States
| 
|-
| Win
| align=center| 6-2
| Dustin West
| Submission (rear-naked choke)
| Strikeforce: Nashville
| 
| align=center| 1
| align=center| 1:36
| Nashville, Tennessee, United States
| 
|-
| Win
| align=center| 5-2
| Salvador Woods
| TKO (punches)
| CA: Cage Assault
| 
| align=center| 2
| align=center| 1:46
| Memphis, Tennessee, United States
| 
|-
| Win
| align=center| 4-2
| Brandon Barger
| Decision (unanimous)
| HTF: Harrah's Tunica Fights
| 
| align=center| 3
| align=center| 5:00
| Robinsonville, Mississippi, United States
| 
|-
| Loss
| align=center| 3-2
| Jake Hecht
| Submission (triangle choke)
| CA: Battlegrounds
| 
| align=center| 2
| align=center| 2:02
| Millington, Tennessee, United States
| 
|-
| Win
| align=center| 3-1
| Brian White
| TKO (punches)
| Cage Assault: Bragging Rights
| 
| align=center| 1
| align=center| 4:03
| Memphis, Tennessee, United States
| 
|-
| Win
| align=center| 2-1
| Mike Knight
| KO (punch)
| ECL: Brawl For A Cause
| 
| align=center| 1
| align=center| 2:17
| Bixby, Oklahoma, United States
| 
|-
| Win
| align=center| 1-1
| Don Johnson
| TKO (punches)
| SF: Subzero Fighting
| 
| align=center| 3
| align=center| N/A
| Little Rock, Arkansas, United States
| 
|-
| Loss
| align=center| 0-1
| Chris Gates
| Submission (triangle choke)
| AOW: Art of War 4
| 
| align=center| 1
| align=center| 3:34
| Tunica, Mississippi, United States
|

See also
List of male mixed martial artists

References

External links
 
 
 
 

American male mixed martial artists
Lightweight mixed martial artists
Welterweight mixed martial artists
Living people
Year of birth missing (living people)